The Mitropa Cup, officially called the La Coupe de l'Europe Centrale or Central European Cup, was one of the first international major European football cups for club sides. It was conducted among the successor states of the former Austria-Hungary. After World War II in 1951 a replacement tournament named Zentropa Cup was held, but just for one season, the Mitropa Cup name was revived, and again in 1958 the name of the tournament changed to  Danube Cup but only for one season. The tournament was discontinued after 1992.

The most successful club is Vasas with six titles.

History

A first "International" competition for football clubs was founded in 1897 in Vienna. The Challenge Cup was invented by John Gramlick Sr., a co-founder of the Vienna Cricket and Football-Club. In this cup competition all clubs of the Austro-Hungarian Empire that normally would not meet could take part, though actually almost only clubs from the Empire's three major cities Vienna, Budapest and Prague participated. The Challenge Cup was carried out until the year 1911 and is today seen as the predecessor to the Mitropa Cup and consequently the European Cup and Champions League. The last winner of the cup was Wiener Sport-Club, one of the oldest and most traditional football clubs of Austria where the cup still remains.

The idea of a European cup competition was shaped after World War I which brought the defeat and collapse of the Austro-Hungarian Empire. The centre of this idea were the Central European countries that, at this time, were still leading in continental football. In the early 1920s they introduced professional leagues, the first continental countries to do so. Austria started in 1924, followed by Hungary in 1925 and Czechoslovakia in 1926. In order to strengthen the dominance of these countries in European football and to financially support the professional clubs, the introduction of the Mitropa Cup was decided at a meeting in Venice on 17 July, following the initiative of the head of the Austrian Football Association (ÖFB), Hugo Meisl. Moreover, the creation of a European Cup for national teams – that unlike the Challenge Cup and the Mitropa Cup would not be annual – was also part of the agreement. The first matches were played on 14 August 1927. The competition was between the top professional teams of Central Europe.

Initially two teams each from Austria, Hungary, Czechoslovakia and Yugoslavia entered, competing in a knock-out competition. The countries involved could either send their respective league winners and runners-up, or league winners and cup winners to take part. The first winners were the Czech side, AC Sparta Prague. In 1929 Italian teams replaced the Yugoslavian ones. The competition was expanded to four teams from each of the competing countries in 1934. Other countries were invited to participate – Switzerland in 1936, and Romania, Switzerland and Yugoslavia in 1937. Austria was withdrawn from the competition following the Anschluss in 1938. In 1939, prior to the start of World War II, the cup involved only eight teams (two each from Hungary, Czechoslovakia and Italy and one each from Romania and Yugoslavia). The level of the competing nations is clearly shown by Italy's two World Cup titles (1934 & 1938), Czechoslovakia's (1934) and Hungary's (1938) World Cup final, and Austria's (1934) and Yugoslavia's (1930) semi-finals. Out of the eleven different teams competing in the first three World Cups, five were part of the Mitropa Cup.

A tournament was started in 1940, but abandoned before the final match due to World War II. Again, only eight teams competed, three each from Hungary and Yugoslavia and two from Romania. Hungarian Ferencváros and Romanian Rapid (which had won on lots after three draws) qualified for the final, but did not meet because the northern part of Transylvania (lost shortly after World War I) was ceded to Hungary from Romania.

Champions

Finals

Notes

Performances 
Note: The 1960 edition is not included in the list because it was won by a nation rather than club.

By club

Titles by country

Top scorers (1927–1940)

By year

All-time top scorers (1927–1940)

Top scorers (1951–1992)

By season

Mitropa Super Cup Final 
Additionally, a "Mitropa Super Cup" was contested in 1989 between the winners of 1988 and 1989.

See also 
Latin Cup
Balkans Cup

Notes

References 

 
Recurring sporting events established in 1927
Recurring events disestablished in 1992
Defunct international club association football competitions in Europe